Sviatoshyn is a station on Kyiv Metro's Sviatoshynsko-Brovarska Line. The station was opened on 5 November 1971, and is named after Kyiv's Sviatoshyn neighborhood. It was designed by H.V. Holovko, N.S. Kolomiiets, and M.M. Syrkin. The station was formerly known as Sviatoshyno.

The station is shallow underground, along with the Beresteiska and the Nyvky stations, which are the first stations of the Kyiv Metro system that are not lain deep underground. The station consists of a central hall with rows of circular columns near the platforms. On the tiled walls along the tracks is an "abstract" motif. The entrance to the station is connected with passenger tunnels on both ends of the station, passing under the Peremohy Prospekt (Victory Avenue). The western exit is connected to the Sviatoshyn Railway Station.

External links

 Kyivsky Metropoliten – Station description and photographs 
 Metropoliten.kyiv.ua – Station description and photographs 
 Mirmetro.net - Description and photos 

Kyiv Metro stations
Railway stations opened in 1971
1971 establishments in Ukraine